Montserrat (or Maria Montserrat, after the Virgin of Montserrat, is a popular name for girls in Catalonia and several other parts of Catalan-speaking areas. Indeed, it was the second most common given name for women in Catalonia in 2014, according to the Catalan Statistics Institute.

The name is traditionally abbreviated to Montse, Serrat, Rat, Rateta, Tat or Tóna, and more recently, due to foreign influence, also to Monse. 

April 27 is the Montserrat name day, traditionally celebrated in Catalan-speaking areas as a birthday would be in the Anglo-Saxon world.

Sometimes this name appears in the Spanish-speaking world as a given name as is, or sometimes translated as Montserrate or Monserrate (where the final "e" is pronounced /e̞/).

People 
 Montserrat Abelló (1918–2014), Catalan poet
 Montserrat Artamendi (born 1941), Spanish gymnast
 Montserrat Bassa (born 1965), Spanish politician from Catalonia
 Montserrat Boix (born 1960), Spanish journalist
 Montserrat Caballé (1933–2018), Catalan operatic soprano
 Montserrat Garriga Cabrero (1865–1956), Cuban-Spanish botanist
 Montserrat Carulla (1930–2020), Catalan actress 
 Montserrat Cervera Rodon (born 1949), Catalan anti-militarist, feminist, and women's health activist
 Montserrat Ginesta Clavell (born 1952), Spanish illustrator and writer
 Montserrat Puche Díaz (born 1970), Spanish team handball player and coach
 Montserrat Figueras, Catalan soprano
 Montserrat García (born 1989), Andorran slalom canoer
 Montserrat Gibert (born 1948), former mayor of Sant Boi de Llobregat
 Montserrat Gil Torné (born 1966), Andorran politician
 Montserrat Calleja Gómez (born 1973), Spanish physicist
 Montserrat González (born 1994), Paraguayan tennis player 
 Montserrat Grases (1941–1959), Spanish candidate for beatification
 Montserrat Gudiol (1933–2015), Catalonian painter
 Montserrat Guillén (born 1964), Spanish statistician and economist
 Marti Montserrat Guillemat (1906–1990), aka Serramont, Catalan musician
 Montserrat Hidalgo (born 1968), Costa Rican breaststroke swimmer
 Montserrat Julió (1929–2017), Spanish film and television actress
 Montserrat Lombard (born 1982), British actress
 Montserrat Majo (born 1959), Catalan Olympic butterfly swimmer
 Montserrat Marin (born 1968), Spanish handball player
 Montserrat Martí (born 1972), aka Montsita, Spanish soprano
 Montserrat Martin (born 1966), Spanish former archer
 Montserrat Minobis i Puntonet (1942-2019), Catalan feminist journalist
 Montserrat Oliver (born 1966), Mexican fashion model
 Montserrat Pujol (Andorran athlete) (born 1979), Andorran sprinter and long jumper
 Montserrat Pujol (Spanish athlete) (born 1961), Spanish hurdler and runner
 Montserrat Roig (1946–1991), Catalan writer
 Montserrat Ruiz (born 1993), Mexican female mixed martial artist
 Montserrat Sagot, Costa Rican sociologist
 Montserrat Soliva Torrentó (1943-2019), Catalan professor
 Montserrat Teixidor i Bigas (born 1958), Catalan professor at Tufts University
 Montserrat Tomé (born 1982), Spanish football midfielder
 Benicio Monserrate Rafael Del Toro Sánchez, Puerto Rican actor
 Montserrat Torrent (born 1926), Catalan organist
 Montserrat Soliva Torrentó (1943–2019), Catalan doctor of chemistry
 Montserrat Tura (born 1954), Catalan surgeon and politician
 Montserrat Vayreda (1924–2006), Catalan poet
 Montserrat Vilà (born 1964), Catalan ecologist

References

See also 
 Montserrat (disambiguation) 
 Montserrat (surname)

Feminine given names
Catalan feminine given names